The Climate Leadership and Community Protection Act (CLCPA) is a plan signed into law on July 18, 2019 to address climate change and reach net zero emissions in New York State. The Act sets the goals to reduce emissions to 40% below 1990 levels by 2030 and then to 85% below 1990 levels by 2050. The remaining 15% of emissions will be offset, such as by planting trees which take carbon dioxide out of the air, to reach net zero emissions.

Specific emission targets by sector 
One of the main hurdles to reaching this goal is dramatically transferring the source of energy within New York State. By 2030, New York aims to get 70% its electricity from renewable sources and by 2040 the goal is to have all the state's electricity come from carbon-free sources like wind and solar energy. Some New York utility providers claim this goal is too ambitious and will result in higher bills for New York residents. Already about 60% of electricity within New York State is being produced by carbon free sources, mainly hydroelectric dams and nuclear power plants.

Other sectors will also need to adapt to achieve these emissions reductions targets. Transportation makes up one third of the state's emissions, but national emissions reductions standards are being rolled back to allow for more pollution and stricter state standards for reducing transportation emissions are being challenged by the Trump administration. Additionally, many residential and commercial buildings use natural gas or oil to heat their homes. To reach reduction targets, New York will likely need to invest in the innovation and implementation of new heating systems powered by renewable energy sources. These measures build upon an earlier law (Local Law 97 of 2019) to reduce emissions in existing large buildings in New York City.

Climate justice provisions 
The plan includes certain stipulations to direct no less than 35% of the program's benefits to historically disadvantaged communities based on a number of determinants related to "public health, environmental hazards, and socioeconomic factors" and decided by the newly created Climate Justice Working Group. Additionally, the Act also aims to create a "community air monitoring program" to monitor air quality standards and pollutant levels on a community level, address air quality problems as they arise in communities affected by local air pollution, and take special care to ensure criteria pollutants are eliminated in disadvantaged communities first.

Climate Action Council 
The Act created a 22-member Climate Action Council to publish actionable proposals to reduce emissions to target levels within the timespan allowed. The Climate Action Council will publish their preliminary plans within two years of the CLCPA becoming law and then update their plan every five years thereafter. Every economic sector including the transportation, building, industrial, commercial, and agricultural sectors should have a customized plan with a number of strategies for reducing their sector-specific emissions.

History 
The CLCPA is the product of years of advocacy by New York environmentally focused community organizations to gain political support in the New York State Legislature. The CLCPA is a version of a previous bill, the Climate and Community Protection Act (CCPA). New York Renews, a coalition of over 300 "environmental, justice, faith, labor, and community groups," is cited as being instrumental in the bill's passage and was "the force behind the nation's most progressive climate law [the CLCPA]". New York Renews is now pushing for further progressive legislation to fully fund and carry out the CLCPA, incentivize the creation of new clean energy, and raise revenues by taxing polluters and the ultra-rich through the Climate, Jobs, and Justice Package (CJJP).

References 

New York (state) law
Environment and society
Environmental law in the United States
Environmental justice in the United States
Environmental policy